São Domingos do Norte is a municipality located in the Brazilian state of Espírito Santo. Its population was 8,687 (2020) and its area is 299 km².

References

Sao Domingos